Thomas Meehan (1 August 1896 – 18 August 1924) was an English footballer who played at wing half. He was capped by England at international level.

He played for Rochdale during the First World War, before moving to Manchester United in 1919. He made 53 appearances for United, scoring six goals, and signed for Chelsea in 1920 for £3,300. At the time of his move south, Meehan was rated one of the best half-backs in England, and made his debut for the national side in October 1923.

He was a regular in the Chelsea team over the next three years, playing in 133 games for the club, before being struck down with encephalitis lethargica, an inflammation of the brain which had reached an epidemic scale in the years after the First World War. He died in 1924.

References
Bibliography

Footnotes

1896 births
1924 deaths
People from Harpurhey
English footballers
England international footballers
Association football wing halves
Rochdale A.F.C. players
Manchester United F.C. players
Chelsea F.C. players
English Football League players
English Football League representative players